MacRobertson Miller Airlines (MMA) was a Western Australian airline that operated between 1927 and 1993. After being purchased by Ansett Transport Industries in 1968, it was eventually rebranded Ansett WA.

History

In 1919, Horrie Miller purchased an Armstrong Whitworth F.K.8 from the United Kingdom and launched the Commercial Aviation Company, in Rochester, Victoria. On 8 October 1920, he registered the Commercial Aviation Company. In 1927, the Commercial Aviation Company commenced weekly Adelaide to Mount Gambier services with an Airco DH.9.

During May 1928, in partnership with the backing of chocolate millionaire Macpherson Robertson, Miller formed MacRobertson-Miller Aviation. In October 1934, MacRobertson-Miller Aviation transferred its main base to Perth, after it won a Commonwealth Government contract for airmail services to Daly Waters in the Northern Territory that had previously been operated by West Australian Airways.

In 1955, MacRobertson-Miller Aviation and Airlines WA merged with MacRobertson's holding a 62% shareholding. MacRobertson Miller operated a network of more than 32,000 km, from Esperance in Western Australia to Darwin in the Northern Territory.

On 19 April 1963, Ansett Transport Industries purchased MacRobertson's 62% shareholding and a further 8% from Horrie Miller after MMA, in desperate need of funds for new Fokker F27 Friendship aircraft and planned new jet aircraft, approached Ansett to purchase a major share. Ansett purchased the remaining 30% in November 1968. It was rebranded as MacRobertson Miller Airline Services in June 1969, Airlines of Western Australia in July 1981 and Ansett WA in November 1984. The Ansett WA operation was absorbed into Ansett Australia in 1993.

Almost inevitably - because of its initials - it was known locally as 'Mickey Mouse Airlines'.

Aircraft
Early aircraft used by the airline included the Fokker Universal, Avro Ansons, de Havilland DH.84 Dragons, Lockheed Model 10 Electras and Douglas DC-3s. Later aircraft included the Fokker F27 Friendship turboprop, a leased Vickers Viscount turboprop, a Douglas DC-9 jet leased from Ansett, Piaggio P.166 twin prop aircraft, de Havilland Canada DHC-6 Twin Otter STOL-capable turboprops, Fokker F28 Fellowship jets (both the series 1000 and 4000 twinjets) and British Aerospace BAe 146 jets. The airline's Fokker aircraft were amongst the hardest working in the world with some of the highest utilisation rates in the world. MMA's F28s flew the world's longest twinjet route at one stage, and certainly the world's longest F28 flight, Perth to Kununurra. According to the 5 April 1970 MMA system timetable, the airline was operating F28 jet service into Dampier, Darwin, Derby, Kununurra, Perth and Port Hedland at this time.   MMA also flew one of the world's shortest scheduled air services, from Perth to Rottnest Island flying the Douglas DC-3 and later the Fokker F-27 Friendship. MMA's first Fokker F28 Fellowship was actually leased from Braathens SAFE of Norway (VH-MMJ c/n 11013) and returned to Fokker as PH-ZAH after the first of the ordered aircraft arrived. VH-FKD was originally purchased for Ansett division Airlines of New South Wales but transferred to MMA when it proved uneconomical on the NSW intrastate routes. Ironically this aircraft returned to Airlines of New South Wales service several years later.

 The first F27, VH-MMS, RMA-SWAN, was the 39th of the Fokker production line, but the first F27 in the world to reach 10,000 hours. This aircraft flew an average of 15 hours a day, five days per week to some of the most remote places in the world.
 VH-FKA, RMA Pilbara, was the first Fokker F28 Fellowship in the World to exceed 30,000 hrs and was later re-commissioned by Airlines of New South Wales before returning to Perth. It made its final revenue flight Perth-Port Hedland on 26 May 1995 after over 60,000 hrs. VH-FKA was scrapped at Tullamarine Airport, Melbourne in January 1996.

Accidents and incidents

 On 1 July 1949, Douglas DC-3 "Fitzroy" on a schedule flight to Darwin and carrying 14 passengers and a crew of 4 crashed after take-off from Perth in heavy rain. The aircraft crashed into an area of disused army huts north of the town of Guildford (a town directly in line with Perth Airport's major runway 21/03). It is believed to have been caused by the aircraft being incorrectly loaded.

Twenty-two passengers and the four crew on board were killed. The aircraft was originally purchased by Trans Australia Airlines.

Fokker F28 Flight MV 372 Perth to Port Hedland - 30 July 1971, VH-FKC: During the long late night hop destination and onward airports became blanketed with fog. The F28 became dangerously low on fuel and after circling for some time Captain Harold Rowell considered ditching the aircraft in the ocean. However, he eventually landed the jet on a gravel runway in the isolated town of Fitzroy Crossing, landing with less than ten minutes of fuel remaining. No life was lost and no injury occurred.
Fokker F28 Fellowships of MMA assisted with the evacuation of Darwin after Cyclone Tracy in December 1974. One F28-1000 carried 128 evacuees, mostly children, on a flight to Perth, though most aircraft carried 80, 20 more than the standard 60 passengers. The MMA F28s helped evacuate 1,250 people out of Darwin in four days.
On 17 January 1974, Fokker F-28-1000 VH-FKA operating Flight MV 492 (a Perth to Darwin "milk run" with 4 stops) overran the runway at Broome Airport. The weather was wet and the aircraft overran the runway threshold by 82 metres, crashing through a wire and picket fence before stopping with the nosewheel sunk in mud. There were no injuries and some minor damage to the aircraft nosewheel doors, a fuselage mounted landing light and the oxygen access panel.
On 26 September 1983, Fokker F28 VH-FKA took off from Perth Airport on a routine flight to the North West. As the aircraft banked left after takeoff on Runway 21, the main passenger door/airstairs suddenly opened. The air hostess sitting in the jump seat adjacent the door lost her shoes. The door had been closed but the lock bar had not been moved to the upright "lock" position. Ground crew also failed to see the outside door release (aft of the door on the fuselage) was not in the correct horizontal position. The co-pilot also failed to see that the door "unlatched" light (which was orange in colour) had remained on. This check formed part of the pre-taxi checklist. However, bright sunlight glare through the starboard cockpit windows made it difficult to see that the light was on. The door fell open as the cabin pressure increased and as the aircraft climbed and banked left. The aircraft circled for two hours above Perth burning fuel before making a safe though spectacular landing.

See also
 List of defunct airlines of Australia
 Aviation in Australia

References

External links

Airlines established in 1927
Airlines disestablished in 1993
Airlines of Western Australia
Ansett Australia
Defunct airlines of Australia
 
Companies based in Perth, Western Australia
Australian companies established in 1927
Australian companies disestablished in 1993